Berne Union High School is a public high school in Sugar Grove, Ohio.  It is the only high school in the Berne Union Local Schools district.  Their nickname is The Grove.

Ohio High School Athletic Association State Championships
 Boys Baseball – 1938

 Jesse Oxley (Track & Field)- Men's Division III Pole Vault Champion- 2012

The Berne Union Band program 
Berne Union's marching band (BUGRMB) competes in Class A and AA in OMEA Adjudicated events. Since 1996, BUGRMB has earned 32 Grand Champion Awards, 39 Reserve Grand Champion Awards, 95 1st in Class, 29 2nd in Class, 65 Best Auxiliary, and 57 Best Percussion Awards.   Since 1997 the Berne Union Wind Ensemble has traveled to Toronto (4x) Virginia Beach (2x), St. Louis (3x), Chicago, Gatlinburg, and Dayton/Cincinnati to perform and participate in national and international festivals.  The ensemble recently traveled to Saint Louis and performed in Music in the Parks having an overall score of 94/100 earning first place.

Sports at Berne Union 
Softball, Girls Basketball, Boys Basketball, Golf, Track, Cross Country, Football, Baseball, Girls Volleyball.

Eastland-Fairfield Career & Technical School

References

External links
 District Website

High schools in Fairfield County, Ohio
Public high schools in Ohio
Public middle schools in Ohio
Public elementary schools in Ohio
1917 establishments in Ohio